Nataša Tramišak (born 6 May 1982) is a Croatian politician who served as the Minister of Regional Development and EU Funds from 2020 to 2023.

See also 
Cabinet of Andrej Plenković II

References 

Living people
1982 births
Place of birth missing (living people)
21st-century Croatian women politicians
21st-century Croatian politicians
Women government ministers of Croatia
University of Osijek alumni
Croatian Democratic Union politicians